Royal Fremantle Golf Club is a golf club in Fremantle, Western Australia. It was established in 1905. Multiple prominent golf tournaments have been hosted at the venue including the Australian PGA Championship and Royal Fremantle Open.

History 
In 1904, roughly twenty people who lived in the Fremantle area met regularly at His Lordship’s Parlor, a local hotel, to talk about creating a golf course. On July 20, 1905 the club was formally created. For the site of the course, the members quickly decided to use 196 acres of government land that was currently being leased to cattle famers. In early August, the Fremantle Municipal Council approved a loan of £500 to assist with the development of the first nine holes. A month later, in September, the club was formally established with 60 members and, in November, formally incorporated.

However, there were many problems converting the designated territory into a golf course. The terrain was rocky and had an inadequate water supply. Cattle, rabbits, and goats regularly trespassed into the land. The goats were especially problematic, as they would often eat "young tree plantings as fast as they were planted." The establishment of "pig" wire netting was originally recommended but, in efforts to save money, the club ultimately decided to construct warning signs "that goats trespassing on the Links Reserve will be shot." 

Despite the challenges, by 1906 the first nine holes "became playable." The following year the Governor of Western Australia officially opened the course. In 1909 the full 18 holes were completed. Fremantle became the first 18-hole course in the state. Two years later it hosted the state's inaugural amateur championship. It also hosted a club championship in 1909. 

Membership climbed the first decade of the club's history but abruptly dropped during World War I. By 1930, however, membership had returned to pre-war levels. In addition in 1930, the Crown certified the club's "Royal status." Royal Fremantle was then "the Premier Club in Western Australia." 

The course has hosted several significant golf tournaments over its history. In 1960 it hosted the Australian PGA Championship. In the late 1970s and early 80s it hosted the Royal Fremantle Open.

The club celebrated its centenary in 2005.

Other Information 
The course has Kikuyu fairways and Bentgrass greens.

In the early 1980s the course record of 66 was established. It stood for 25 years until 2006 when Ric Kulacz, a local amateur player, shot a 64. This record was tied by Paul Fenton in 2009 at the course's club championship.

Minjee Lee, currently one of the top female golfers in the world, honed her game at the club. Touring professionals Craig Parry and Greg Chalmers both graduated from the club's junior program.

Tournaments hosted 

 2020 Western Australian Open
2015 Western Australia Open
2011 Western Australia Open
1982 Royal Fremantle Open
 1981 Royal Fremantle Open
 1980 Royal Fremantle Open
 1979 Royal Fremantle Open
 1978 Royal Fremantle Open
 1977 Royal Fremantle Open
1973 Western Australia State Open
1961 Western Australia junior championship
 1960 Australian PGA Championship
1947 Western Australia PGA Championship
1937 Western Australia PGA Championship
1933 Western Australia PGA Championship

See also
List of golf clubs granted Royal status

References

External links

Golf clubs and courses in Western Australia
Sports venues in Perth, Western Australia
Sport in Fremantle

1905 establishments in Australia

Sports venues completed in 1905
Organisations based in Australia with royal patronage
Royal golf clubs